Cyprinus rubrofuscus, the Amur carp, is a species of cyprinid fish, and is the wild form of the well-known koi. It is widespread in the fresh waters of eastern Asia, native to China, Vietnam and Laos from the Amur to Red River basins, and has also been introduced outside its native range. It is known for its muddy flavor and boniness, hence, it is not commonly eaten by locals except when stewed.

In the past, it was considered a subspecies of the common (or European) carp, often under the scientific name C. carpio haematopterus (a synonym), but the two differ in genetics and meristics, leading recent authorities to recognize them as separate species. Although earlier studies also have found minor differences between northern ("haematopterus") and southern ("viridiviolaceus") populations in Eastern Asia in both meristics and genetics, later studies have found that they are not monophyletic. However, any phylogenetic structure is difficult to establish because of widespread translocations of carp between different regions. The parent species of the domesticated koi carp is an East Asian carp, possibly C. rubrofuscus (not C. carpio).

References

Cyprinus
Freshwater fish of China
Fish of East Asia
Freshwater fish of Asia
Taxa named by Bernard Germain de Lacépède 
Fish described in 1803